The 1963–64 daytime network television schedule for the three major English-language commercial broadcast networks in the United States covers the weekday daytime hours from September 1963 to August 1964.

Talk shows are highlighted in yellow, local programming is white, reruns of prime-time programming are orange, game shows are pink, soap operas are chartreuse, news programs are gold and all others are light blue. New series are highlighted in bold.

Monday-Friday

Saturday

Sunday

See also
1963-64 United States network television schedule (prime-time)
1963-64 United States network television schedule (late night)

United States weekday network television schedules
1963 in American television
1964 in American television